The Golden Vein is a 1955 Italian drama film directed Mauro Bolognini and starring Märta Torén and Richard Basehart. It is based on a play by Guglielmo Zorzi which had previously been made into a 1928 silent film The Golden Vein.

Plot 
Corrado is a teenager who lives with his mother Maria who has been totally dedicated to him since her husband's death. The boy invites Stefano, an archaeologist, to his house, who immediately falls in love with the woman. Maria begins to flourish again but her son, exaggeratedly jealous, tries to stop this story in the bud and at the same time ruins his first love affair with Carla. It will be Maria who will help Corrado to win back the girl; in turn Corrado will call Stefano back, allowing him to be next to his mother.

Cast 
 Märta Torén - Maria
 Richard Basehart - Ing. Stefano Manfredi
 Titina De Filippo - Teresa
 Terence Hill - Corrado
 Bianca Maria Ferrari - Carla Albani
 Elsa Vazzoler - Duchessa Giulia Carena
 Hélène Vercors - Signora Albani
 Arturo Bragaglia
 Violetta Napierska - Violetta

References

External links 
 

1955 drama films
1955 films
Italian drama films
Films directed by Mauro Bolognini
Italian black-and-white films
1950s Italian films
1950s Italian-language films